Kunchikal Falls is a waterfall in India located in the Nidagodu village near Masthikatte in the Shimoga district of state Karnataka. Kunchikal falls cascades down rocky boulders and the total height of the falls is 455 meters (1493 feet) according to the World Waterfall Database. Kunchikal falls is formed by the Varahi river.

After the construction of the Mani Dam near Masthikatte and an underground power generation station near Hulikal, Shimoga district, the water flow to the falls is greatly reduced and is visible only during the rainy season (July-Sept). As the falls are within a restricted area , a gate pass is required to visit.

See also
List of waterfalls in India
List of waterfalls in India by height
Varahi River

References

External links 
World waterfalls database entry

Waterfalls of Karnataka
Geography of Udupi district
Geography of Shimoga district